The Clarkboro Ferry is a cable ferry in the Canadian province of Saskatchewan. The ferry crosses the South Saskatchewan River at Clark's Crossing, carrying Grid Road 784 across the river, and connecting Warman in the west and Aberdeen in the east.  The ferry is named for the community of Clarkboro located southeast of the ferry's eastern terminal. The former town of Clarkboro was home to a section crew on the CNR, had a post office, a general store, a railroad siding, a water tower for steam locomotives and two grain elevators (Saskatchewan Pool Elevator Co. No. 760). Both Clarkboro and Clark's Crossing are named for John Fowler Clark, who homesteaded the area in 1882.

The ferry is operated by the Saskatchewan Ministry of Highways and Infrastructure and is free of toll.  The ferry operates only while the river is free of ice, typically from mid April to mid November.  During this time, the ferry runs on demand from 5:00 A.M. CST to midnight.

The capacity of the ferry is six cars.

The ferry typically carries over 70,000 vehicles each year, the most of any ferry in province. In 1999, the Clarkboro Ferry carried 52,185 vehicles.

See also 
List of crossings of the South Saskatchewan River

References 

Aberdeen No. 373, Saskatchewan
Corman Park No. 344, Saskatchewan
Ferries of Saskatchewan
Cable ferries in Canada
Division No. 15, Saskatchewan